William Tyler (September 26, 1905 – January, 1970), nicknamed "Steel Arm", was an American Negro league pitcher between 1925 and 1930.

A native of Evansville, Indiana, Tyler made his Negro leagues debut in 1925 for the Memphis Red Sox. He went on to play for the Chicago American Giants and Kansas City Monarchs, then returned to Memphis in 1927 and 1928 before finishing his career with the Detroit Stars in 1929 and 1930. Tyler died in Elkton, Kentucky in 1970 at age 64.

References

External links
 and Seamheads

1905 births
1970 deaths
Chicago American Giants players
Detroit Stars players
Kansas City Monarchs players
Memphis Red Sox players
20th-century African-American sportspeople
Baseball pitchers